Giancarlo Bigazzi (5 September 1940 – 19 January 2012) was an Italian music producer and composer. He was a former member of comedy music group Squallor.

Life and career 
Born in Florence, he was one of the best known Italian songwriters and lyricists of the 1970s and 1980s. He wrote some of the most successful Italian pop records, many of which became international hits, such as "Gloria", "Self Control", "No Me Ames", "Tu", "Take the Heat off Me", "Mama". He was also a film score composer; among his soundtracks are Mery per sempre, Ragazzi fuori and the Oscar-winner Mediterraneo.
Bigazzi collaborated for 2 years with singer Mia Martini, writing also her Eurovision track "Rapsodia".

References

External links 
 
 Giancarlo Bigazzi at Discogs

1940 births
2012 deaths
Italian film score composers
Italian male film score composers
People from Reggio Emilia
20th-century Italian musicians
Italian lyricists
20th-century Italian male musicians
Ciak d'oro winners